Giacomellia is a genus of moths in the family Saturniidae first described by Eugène Louis Bouvier in 1930.

Species
Giacomellia bilineata (Burmeister, 1878)
Giacomellia inversa (Giacomelli, 1911)

References

Ceratocampinae
Taxa named by Eugène Louis Bouvier